Lorraine Higgins (born 3 August 1979) is an Irish barrister, and a former Labour Party politician who represented the party in the 24th Seanad after being nominated by the Taoiseach Enda Kenny. From Galway, she is a graduate of NUI Galway (acquiring a B.A. from the university in 2001) and, later, the King's Inns. During her time there she was Labour Party Seanad spokesperson on Reform and Foreign Affairs.

Career 
She ran as a candidate in the Galway East constituency at the 2011 general election. In May 2011, she was nominated by the Taoiseach Enda Kenny to the 24th Seanad.

Higgins was a candidate for the Labour Party in the Midlands–North-West constituency for the 2014 European Parliament election but failed to take a seat during one of the worst elections for the Party. She did, however, get the most Party votes in all the constituencies they contested.

In 2015, leading national publication, the Irish Times named her as one of the Top 5 People in Politics to Watch and one of the Top 50 People in Ireland to Watch.

She unsuccessfully contested the 2016 Irish general election for the Galway East constituency.

She was not selected for re-appointment to the 25th Seanad. Higgins complained about how "regrettable" it was that more women were not included in the parliamentary party. She was quoted as saying: "For me it was the last throw of the dice and I probably won't be involved in representative politics again".

In March 2017, Higgins became employed as Head of Public Affairs and Communications and as a board member with Retail Excellence. She was promoted to the position of CEO in July 2018. 

She subsequently founded leading digital representative body, Digital Business Ireland, and Dublin-based consultancy company, Rockwood Public Affairs.

She was appointed to the position of Honorary Consul of the Slovak Republic in 2019.

In August 2020, she attended a golf party in County Galway which breached the COVID-19 guidelines.

2015 threats and harassment 
During the summer of 2015, a man named Stephen French of Walkinstown sent her messages involving violent and anti-Semitic content, saying that he "will watch her bleed" and that he is "going to blow her fucking Jew nose right off". In the aftermath of the incidents, French was spared from serving time in jail and given a suspended six-month sentence after his guilty plea to three charges of threatening Higgins and two charges of harassing her.

References

External links 
 Lorraine Higgins's page on the Labour Party website

1979 births
Living people
Alumni of the University of Galway
Irish barristers
Irish female golfers
Irish women lawyers
Labour Party (Ireland) senators
Members of the 24th Seanad
21st-century women members of Seanad Éireann
Nominated members of Seanad Éireann
People from Galway (city)
Politicians from County Galway
Alumni of King's Inns
Victims of cyberbullying